The conjugate residual method is an iterative numeric method used for solving systems of linear equations. It's a Krylov subspace method very similar to the much more popular conjugate gradient method, with similar construction and convergence properties.

This method is used to solve linear equations of the form

where A is an invertible and Hermitian matrix, and b is nonzero.

The conjugate residual method differs from the closely related conjugate gradient method primarily in that it involves more numerical operations and requires more storage, but the system matrix is only required to be Hermitian, not Hermitian positive definite.

Given an (arbitrary) initial estimate of the solution , the method is outlined below:

the iteration may be stopped once  has been deemed converged.

Note: the above algorithm can be transformed so to make only one symmetric matrix-vector multiplication in each iteration.

Preconditioning

By making a few substitutions and variable changes, a preconditioned conjugate residual method may be derived in the same way as done for the conjugate gradient method:

The preconditioner  must be symmetric positive definite. Note that the residual vector here is different from the residual vector without preconditioning.

References
 Yousef Saad, Iterative methods for sparse linear systems (2nd ed.), page 194, SIAM. .

Numerical linear algebra
Articles with example pseudocode